The 1993 Individual Long Track World Championship was the 23rd edition of the FIM speedway Individual Long Track World Championship. The event was held on 26 September 1993 in Mühldorf, Germany.

The world title was won by Simon Wigg of England for the fourth time.

Final Classification 

 E = eliminated (no further ride)
 f = fell
 ef = engine failure
 x = excluded

References 

1993
Speedway competitions in Germany
Motor
Motor